Knock Out is a Japanese martial arts promotion and brand established in 2016 by the Bushido Road subsidiary Kixroad. It is currently run by Def Fellow.

In 2019, the promotion established two different rulesets. The Knock Out-Red ruleset allowed elbow strikes, sweeps and throws. The Knock Out-Black ruleset followed the traditional K-1 ruleset, which allowed kicks and strikes with fists or knees, while extended clinching, elbow strikes and throws of any kind were prohibited.

Current champions

History
On September 14, 2016, Bushido Road announced the establishment of a new kickboxing promotion called Knock Out. The promotion was founded jointly by Riki Onodera and Road Fight, and initially partnered with another kickboxing promotion "NO KICK NO LIFE".

KNOCK OUT held their first event, called "Knock Out vol.0", at the Tokyo Dome City Hall on December 5, 2016. It was headlined by a muay thai bout between Sirimongkol PKsaenchaimuaythaigym and the Rajadamnern 135 lbs champion Genji Umeno. Tenshin Nasukawa faced the two-weight Lumpinee champion Wanchalong PK.Saenchai in the co-headliner. A half hour segment of the event was later broadcast by Tokyo MX on December 31, 2016. The event was fully broadcast on January 1, 2017.

Riki Onodera retired from the position of producer on April 29, 2019. On May 20, 2019, it was announced that he would be replaced by Genki Yamaguchi. On the same day, Knock Out announced that they had entered into a partnership agreement with Rebels, another kickboxing and muay thai promotion.

On June 15, 2020, Bushido Road sold Knock Out ownership rights to Def Fellow, the operating company of Rebels.

At a press conference held on September 28, 2020, producer Genki Yamaguchi announced his retirement. Former K-1 producer and Good Loser president Mitsuru Miyata was announced as his replacement.

On December 18, 2020, Def Fellow announced they would merge Rebels into the Knock Out brand. The merger occurred in March 2021.

Rules
The current rules were last revised in February 2023, and are as follows:

 Matches are won by knockout, technical knockout, disqualification or judges decision. 
 A knockout victory is awarded if one competitor is rendered unable to continue competing as a result of a single strike.
 A technical knockout victory is awarded is one of the following cases: 
 (1) if one of the competitors is unable to rise in time (i.e. within 10 seconds) following a knockdown
 (2) if one of the competitors suffers three knockdowns inside of a single round
 (3) if the corner-men of one of the competitors throws in the towel, or opts to retire their fighter at the end of the round
 (4) if the referee decides that a competitor cannot continue fighting due to an injury, or if they receive significant damage without intelligently defending themselves
 Matches are scored based on the following criteria:
 (1) number of knockdowns
 (2) presence or absence of damage done to the opponent
 (3) number of clean hits
 (4) aggressiveness
 In case of a draw, an extension round will be fought, after which one competitor will necessarily be declared a winner
 Spitting, headbutts, biting, groin strikes, strikes to the back of the head, striking after the round has ended or the referee has called for a break, striking while the opponent is knocked down and excessive holding are all considered fouls. Furthermore, under the KNOCKOUT BLACK ruleset, sweeps, throws, and strikes with the elbow are prohibited. Fights under the BLACK rules allow a fighter to land a single strike while holding an opponent's leg, if it was caught after an attempted kick
If one of the competitors commits a foul, they will be given a caution and a warning. If the foul is repeated, they will be given a yellow card, which results in a point deduction. Should the foul be committed once again, the competitor will be given a red card, and will be disqualified.

Championship history

King of Knock Out

Super Lightweight Championship
Weight limit: 65 kg

Lightweight Championship
Weight limit: 61.5 kg

Super Bantamweight Championship
Weight limit: 55 kg

Flyweight Championship
Weight limit: 51 kg

Knock Out-Red

Red Super Welterweight Championship
Weight limit: 70 kg

Red Lightweight Championship
Weight limit: 62.5 kg

Red Super Featherweight Championship
Weight limit: 60 kg

Red Featherweight Championship
Weight limit: 57.5 kg

Red Super Bantamweight Championship
Weight limit: 55 kg

Red Bantamweight Championship
Weight limit: 53.5 kg

Red Super Flyweight Championship
Weight limit: 52 kg

Knock Out-Black

Black Super Middleweight Championship
Weight limit: 75 kg

Black Super Welterweight Championship
Weight limit: 70 kg

Black Welterweight Championship
Weight limit: 67.5 kg

Black Super Lightweight Championship
Weight limit: 65 kg

Black Lightweight Championship
Weight limit: 62.5 kg

Black Featherweight Championship
Weight limit: 57.5 kg

Black Super Bantamweight Championship
Weight limit: 55 kg

Black Super Flyweight Championship
Weight limit: 52 kg

Black Female Minimumweight Championship
Weight limit: 47.5 kg

Black Female Atomweight Championship
Weight limit: 46 kg

Grand Prix

References

Kickboxing organizations
Sports organizations established in 2016
2016 establishments in Japan
Kickboxing in Japan